Gunnar Schellenberger (born 16 January 1960) is a German politician for the CDU and since 2021 president of the Landtag of Saxony-Anhalt.

Life and politics 

Schellenberger was born in 1960 in the East German city of Chemnitz and became a teacher for mathematics and physics.
Schellenberger entered the christdemocratic CDU in 1993 and became president of the state diet of Saxony-Anhalt in 2021.

References 

Living people
1960 births
21st-century German politicians
21st-century German women politicians
Christian Democratic Union of Germany politicians
Members of the Landtag of Saxony-Anhalt
People from Chemnitz